Dale A. Anderson is an American aerospace engineer, computational fluid dynamicist, researcher, author and professor. He pioneered research in computational fluid dynamics (CFD) with his work at Iowa State University (ISU), alongside John C. Tannehill and Richard H. Pletcher. Anderson was the Professor of Aerospace Engineering, Vice President for Research, and Dean of Graduate Studies at the University of Texas at Arlington, United States. He is best known for his overall contributions to the field of computational fluid dynamics (CFD).

Education and career
Anderson received his B.S. from St. Louis University in 1957, his M.S. in 1959 and Ph.D. in 1964 degrees in Aerospace Engineering from the Iowa State University (ISU), Ames, Iowa.

He began his academic career as an assistant professor of aerospace engineering at ISU in 1964 and was promoted to full professor in 1975. In the late 1970s, NASA assisted ISU with a Computational Fluid Dynamics Center (also known as CFD Center) only one of 7 such centers built in the country, it was headed by Dale Anderson and assisted by John Tannehill, Richard Pletcher, Jerald Vogel, and Richard Hindman. The CFD Center was designed to coordinate research and interdepartmental course offerings. In 1980, The CDF Center won NASA recognition. Anderson, Tannehill, and Pletcher co-authored the textbook Computational Fluid Mechanics and Heat Transfer, originally published in 1984 but which came to be used by more than 90 schools and in 2012 published its third edition.

In 1984, he moved to the University of Texas at Arlington (UTA), where he was professor of Aerospace Engineering and held several administrative positions, including Vice President for Research and Dean of Graduate Studies. In 1986, Anderson was selected to receive the Saint Louis University Parks College Alumni Merit Award. He retired from UTA in 2005.

In 2006, Anderson was inducted into Hall of Distinguished Alumni at his alma mater, Iowa State University.

Books
Computational Fluid Mechanics and Heat Transfer, with John C. Tannehill and Richard H. Pletcher, 2nd ed., Taylor & Francis, 1997.

References

American aerospace engineers
Iowa State University alumni
Iowa State University faculty
University of Texas at Arlington faculty
Computational fluid dynamicists
Living people
Year of birth missing (living people)